Peterborough East was a federal electoral district represented in the House of Commons of Canada from 1867 to 1925. It was located in the province of Ontario. It was created by the British North America Act of 1867 which divided the County of Peterborough into two ridings.

The East Riding consisted of the Townships of Asphodel, Belmont and Methuen, Douro, Dummer, Galway, Harvey, Minden, Stanhope and Dysart, Otonabee, and Snowden, and the Village of Ashburnham, and any other surveyed Townships lying to the north.

In 1882, it was defined to consist of the townships of Asphodel, Belmont, Methuen, Douro, Dummer, Burleigh, Anstruther, Chandos, Dysart, Dudley, Harcourt, Guilford, Harburn, Bruton, Havelock, Eyre, Clyde, Nightingale, Livingstone, Lawrence, Cavendish, Glamorgan, Cardiff, Monmouth, Otonabee and Harvey, and the villages of Ashburnham, Lakefield and Norwood.

In 1903, it was redefined to consist of the townships of Anstruther, Asphodel, Belmont, Burleigh, Chandos, Douro, Dummer, Methuen and Otonabee, and the villages of Havelock, Lakefield and Norwood. In 1914, it was redefined of the townships of Anstruther, Asphodel, Belmont, Burleigh, Chandos, Douro, Dummer, Methuen and Otonabee, and the villages of Havelock, Lakefield and Norwood.

The electoral district was abolished in 1924 when it was redistributed between Hastings—Peterborough and Peterborough West ridings.

Electoral history

|- 
  
|Conservative
|Peregrine Maitland Grover 
|align="right"|  956    
 
|Unknown
|James Anderson 
|align="right"| 644   
|}

|- 
  
|Conservative
|Peregrine Maitland Grover 
|align="right"| 804    
 
|Unknown
|Evans Ingram 
|align="right"|752    
|}

|- 
  
|Liberal
|James Hall 
|align="right"|  993   
 
|Unknown
|R.D. Rogers
|align="right"|879 
|}

|- 
  
|Conservative
|John Burnham
|align="right"| 1,262    
 
|Unknown
|T. Buck
|align="right"| 1,236    
|}

|- 
  
|Conservative
|John Burnham
|align="right"|  1,449    
 
|Unknown
|William E. Roxburgh 
|align="right"|1,192    
|}

|- 
 
|Independent Liberal
|John Lang 
|align="right"|  1,697    
  
|Conservative
|John Burnham
|align="right"|1,588    
|}

|- 
  
|Conservative
|Burnham, John  
|align="right"|1,832    
  
|Liberal
|Rork, Thomas 
|align="right"| 1,803   
|}

 
|Independent Liberal
|Lang, John
|align="right"| 2,353    
  
|Conservative
|Burnham, John 
|align="right"| 1,738    
|}

|- 
 
|Independent Liberal
|Lang, John
|align="right"|1,876    
  
|Conservative
|Sexsmith, John A.
|align="right"|1,702    
|}

|- 
  
|Liberal
| Finlay, John  
|align="right"|1,588   
  
|Conservative
|Sexsmith, John 
|align="right"| 1,518    
|}

|- 
  
|Conservative
|Sexsmith, John A. 
|align="right"| 1,922    
  
|Liberal
|Tanner, Edward A. 
|align="right"| 1,540   
|}

|- 
  
|Conservative
|Sexsmith John A.  
|align="right"| 1,992    
  
|Liberal
|Kerr, Francis D.
|align="right"|  1,399   
|}

|- 
  
|Government
|Sexsmith, John A.
|align="right"| 2,555   
  
|Opposition
|Johnston, William H.
|align="right"| 1,389   
|}

|- 

  
|Conservative
|Sexsmith, John A.
|align="right"| 2,296    
  
|Liberal
|Dewart, John A. 
|align="right"|1,503   
|}

See also 

 List of Canadian federal electoral districts
 Past Canadian electoral districts

External links 

 Website of the Parliament of Canada

Former federal electoral districts of Ontario